Speed skating at the 1998 Winter Olympics, was held from 8 to 20 February. Ten events were contested at M-Wave.

Medal summary

Medal table

The Netherlands dominated the Nagano speed skating events, winning five gold medals and eleven medals overall, their highest total in any Winter games, as of 2010. Bart Veldkamp's bronze medal was the first in speed skating for Belgium, and the first at the Winter Games for the country in 50 years. Lyudmila Prokasheva's bronze medal for Kazakhstan was that country's first in the sport as well, and Prokasheva became the first woman from Kazakhstan to earn an Olympic medal.

Gianni Romme and Marianne Timmer led the individual medal tables, with two gold each.

Men's events

Women's events

Records

Five world records and twelve Olympic records were set in Nagano.

Participating NOCs

Twenty-five nations competed in the speed skating events at Nagano. New Zealand and Portugal made their Olympic speed skating debuts.

References

 
1998 in speed skating
Olympics, 1998
1998 Winter Olympics events